Sacred Heart College Champagnat Campus is co-educational Years 7 - 9 in Mitchell Park, Adelaide, South Australia.

In 2018, Marymount College amalgamated with Sacred Heart College and in 2019 after 62 years of girls education, Marymount Campus staff and students relocated to Champagnat Campus at Mitchell Park, operating as a co-educational school for girls & boys in Years 7 – 9. Champagnat Campus belongs to a group of 2 educational facilities. This group consists of Sacred Heart College Marcellin Campus and  Sacred Heart College Champagnat Campus.

House system 
As with most Australian schools, Sacred Heart College utilises a house system, through which students participate in intra-school competitions and activities. For intra-school competitions each house is accompanied by a "sporting name". The college currently has five houses:

See also

 List of schools in South Australia
 Catholic education in Australia

References

Educational institutions established in 1967
1967 establishments in Australia
Catholic secondary schools in Adelaide